Danny McCormack (born 28 February 1972 in South Shields) is an English singer and bassist.

Biography
McCormack became the bass player in The Wildhearts in 1991, and soon relocated to London with the band, enjoying success during their commercial peak, before the splits in 1997 and 1998. McCormack went on to form and front The Yo-Yos, with Tom Spencer (ex-Sugarsnatch/The Lurkers), and the band released an album on Sub Pop Records, but they eventually split in 2000.

He re-joined The Wildhearts when they reformed in 2001, but was dropped midway through a tour. He rejoined again in 2002, but left once more in 2003. At the time the group's frontman Ginger penned an open letter to Kerrang!  magazine documenting his close friend's drug problems and wished him a complete recovery. Unexpectedly, he returned to The Wildhearts in 2005 for a live DVD.

McCormack briefly played with Dogs D'Amour before re-forming The Yo-Yos in 2005, and recording an EP, "Given Up Giving Up". He subsequently supported his younger brother Chris McCormack's band, 3 Colours Red, on their final tour of Germany, but the band fired Danny McCormack halfway through a UK tour in 2005 following further drug problems. He continues to write and live in South Shields.

In late 2006, McCormack announced on his MySpace page that he is working on a new project that is tentatively titled 'The I-Told-You-So's'.

Following a prolonged absence from the music scene for a number of years, McCormack took the stage to play bass at his 40th birthday. The special event featured two gigs in one night at Camden Barfly in London on 17 February 2012. Performances came from a reunited Yo-Yos - consisting of McCormack, Spencer and Rich Jones along with guest drummers - as well as a covers set featuring Chris McCormack, Andy Cairns (Therapy?), Ritch Battersby and Stidi (both The Wildhearts). The support band for the night was Plan A - which featured former Wildhearts guitarist Jef.

In 2015, McCormack founded a band called The Main Grains which would later release an EP called Don't Believe Everything You Think. Ahead of the mini-album's release, McCormack almost died after suffering an aneurysm in late 2015 - which later culminated in him losing his lower leg.

The four-piece punk n roll group later played support on a few UK dates of the Ginger Wildheart Band's July 2016 tour. During one of the shows (at the Brudenell Social Club in Leeds on 14 July 2016), McCormack and Ginger played onstage for the first time in more than a decade - with Ginger later announcing he and McCormack had finally buried the hatchet and were friends again. He re-joined the Wildhearts in 2018.

In 2019, McCormack recorded bass with The Wildhearts for their new album "Renaissance Men", the first album the band had released since 2009's Chutzpah and McCormack's first since 1997's Endless Nameless. The album charted at 11 in the UK charts following its release in May 2019. McCormack continues to tour and perform with the band. I. In early 2022 The Wildhearts announced they were taking an indefinite hiatus which meant the subsequent cancellation of all their tour and festival dates. Danny then announced he had started to write his autobiography with Vive Le Rock journalist Guy Shankland. The pair started a Patreon page https://www.patreon.com/Dannywildheart?fan_landing=true help promote and sell the book.

UK Albums
 Earth Vs The Wildhearts - The Wildhearts (East West 1993)
 P.H.U.Q. - The Wildhearts (East West 1995)
 Fishing For Luckies - The Wildhearts (Round 1996)
 Endless Nameless - The Wildhearts (Mushroom 1997)
 Uppers and Downers - The Yo-Yos (Sub Pop 2000)
 Don't Believe Everything You Think - The Main Grains (TSP Records 2000)
 Renaissance Men - The Wildhearts (Graphite 2019)

UK Mini-albums & EPs
 Mondo Akimbo A Go Go - The Wildhearts (East West 1991)
 Don't Be Happy... Just Worry - The Wildhearts (East West 1992)
 Red Light – Green Light EP - The Wildhearts (Round 1996)
 Onwards & Upwards - The Chasers (ChangesOne 2001)
 Giving Up, Giving Up Again - The Yo-Yos (not formally released 2006)
 "Don't Believe Everything You Think" - The Main Grains (TSB 2015)

UK Compilations
 The Best of The Wildhearts - The Wildhearts (East West 1996)
 Landmines and Pantomimes - The Wildhearts (Kuro Neko 1998)
 Coupled With - The Wildhearts (Gut Records 2004)
 The Works - The Wildhearts (Rhino Records 2008)

Live albums
 Anarchic Airwaves - The Wildhearts (Kuro Neko 1999)
 Geordie in Wonderland - The Wildhearts (Snapper 2006)

International releases
 Tokyo Suits Me (Japan only release) - The Wildhearts (Mercury 1999)
 Riff After Riff After Motherfucking Riff (Japan only release) - The Wildhearts (Universal 2002)

DVDs
 Live at the Castle - The Wildhearts (Secret 2005)

References

1972 births
Living people
English male singers
English rock bass guitarists
Male bass guitarists
The Wildhearts members
Musicians from Newcastle upon Tyne
People from South Shields
Musicians from Tyne and Wear
21st-century English singers
21st-century English bass guitarists
21st-century British male singers
English amputees
Amputee musicians